The 2016 Giro d'Italia began on 6 May, and stage 11 occurred on 18 May. The race began with a time trial in Apeldoorn in the Netherlands.

Stage 1
6 May 2016 — Apeldoorn (Netherlands), individual time trial (ITT)

Stage 2
7 May 2016 — Arnhem (Netherlands) to Nijmegen (Netherlands),

Stage 3
8 May 2016 — Nijmegen (Netherlands) to Arnhem (Netherlands),

Stage 4
10 May 2016 — Catanzaro to Praia a Mare,

Stage 5
11 May 2016 — Praia a Mare to Benevento,

Stage 6
12 May 2016 — Ponte to Roccaraso,

Stage 7
13 May 2016 — Sulmona to Foligno,

Stage 8
14 May 2016 — Foligno to Arezzo,

Stage 9
15 May 2016 — Chianti Classico Stage — Radda in Chianti to Greve in Chianti,  individual time trial (ITT)

Stage 10
17 May 2016 — Campi Bisenzio to Sestola,

Stage 11
18 May 2016 — Modena to Asolo,

References

2016 Giro d'Italia
Giro d'Italia stages